Odyssey Television Network, Inc. is a Canadian licensed Greek language television broadcaster who owns and operates three national ethnic channels, available via cable and satellite. Headquartered in Toronto, Ontario, the company has been in operation since 1996 and is headed by John Maniatakos, son of longtime Greek-Canadian broadcasting stalwart, Peter Maniatakos.

Channels

Odyssey Television Network currently operates the following three Greek-language television channels:
Odyssey (OTN1)
ERT World Canada (OTN2)
MEGA Cosmos Canada (OTN3)

In addition to the 3 channels that it has launched itself, Odyssey TV also distributes a number of foreign services in Canada. OTN is the official Canadian distributor for the following channels:
Alpha Sat
Greek Cinema
SportPlus
Star International

Local programming
As part of its mandate to serve Canadians of Greek descent and offer programming of relevance to them, Odyssey Television Network airs an array of local programming on all of its channels including original productions as well as acquired programming from independent producers.

Original productions
Afternoon Magazine (Απογευματινό Μαγαζίνο) - Re-broadcasting of CHTO AM 1690 afternoon program; airs Monday-Friday on Odyssey
Canadian News (Καναδική Eπικαιρότητα) - Daily news bulletin in Greek, overview of the main national news headlines; airs Monday-Friday on Odyssey & MEGA Cosmos Canada
Elliniko Panorama - Weekly news magazine that features news and interviews with members of the Greek community in Toronto; airs Sundays on Odyssey

Independent productions
Edo Montreal (Εδώ Montreal) - Weekly program focusing on Montreal Greek community; airs Sundays on Odyssey
Laval & Montreal - Weekly news magazine that features news and interviews with members of the Greek community in Montreal; airs Saturdays on Odyssey
Orthodox Voice (Ορθόδοξη Φωνή) - Faith-based program about Greek Orthodox religion, produced by the Greek Orthodox Metropolis of Canada; airs Sundays on Odyssey
Zontas Pragmatika - Religious program about Christianity produced by Alpha-Omega Christian Ministries; airs Saturdays on Odyssey

Former productions
Personalities (Προσωπικότητες) - Weekly talk show featuring in-depth discussion with Greek Canadians from all walks of life who have excelled in their chosen field.

The current number of Canadians who are of Greek origin is 271,405, with the majority situated in either Toronto or Montreal.

Personalities
Current on-air personalities at Odyssey Television:

Natassa Haralambopoulou, host of Canadian News
Peter Milonas, co-host of Afternoon Magazine
George Galatsis, co-host of Afternoon Magazine
Katerina Papadopoulos, fill-in host on Canadian News
John Cocconas, host of Edo Montreal

References

External links
Official Odyssey Television Network website
CRTC chart of OTN's assets

Television broadcasting companies of Canada
Companies based in Toronto